This is the discography of Dutch Schlager singer Heintje Simons, who has also released music mononymously as Heintje and as Hein Simons.

Albums

Studio albums

Christmas albums

Charting compilations

Video albums

Singles

Notes

References

Discographies of Dutch artists
Schlager music discographies